Reza Khelili Dylami (born in 1967) is a Swedish politician of the Moderate Party. He was a member of the Riksdag from 2006 to 2010, replacing Beatrice Ask due to her service as the Minister for Justice from 2006 to 2008 and as ordinarie member from 2008 to 2010.

Khelili Dylami is originally of Iranian descent.

External links 
Riksdagen: Reza Khelili Dylami (m)

Members of the Riksdag from the Moderate Party
Swedish people of Iranian descent
Living people
1967 births
Swedish politicians of Iranian descent